Bexley was a parliamentary constituency centred on the Bexley district of what is now south-east London.  It returned one Member of Parliament (MP)  to the House of Commons of the Parliament of the United Kingdom.

History

The constituency was created for the 1945 general election, from parts of the Chislehurst and Dartford seats, and abolished for the 1974 general election and replaced by two new constituencies of Bexleyheath and Sidcup.

The constituency's boundaries were co-terminous with those of the Municipal Borough of Bexley.

The MP when the constituency was abolished, the then Conservative Prime Minister Edward Heath, fought and won the new Sidcup constituency in 1974. He went on to represent the new seat of Old Bexley and Sidcup from 1983 until he retired from parliament in 2001 after being an MP for 50 years.

Members of Parliament

Election results

Elections in the 1940s

Elections in the 1950s

Elections in the 1960s

Election in the 1970s

References

Notes

Parliamentary constituencies in London (historic)
Constituencies of the Parliament of the United Kingdom established in 1945
Constituencies of the Parliament of the United Kingdom disestablished in 1974
Constituencies of the Parliament of the United Kingdom represented by a sitting Prime Minister
London Borough of Bexley
Edward Heath